The Benelli Tre 1130 K is a Benelli dual-sport motorcycle. It has a liquid cooled 4 stroke three cylinder DOHC  engine based on the design used in the Tornado Naked Tre 1130, or TnT. Like the TnT, it also has tubular frame.

See also 
List of Benelli motorcycles

External links
Official website

Tre 1130 K
Dual-sport motorcycles
Motorcycles introduced in 2006